Rolling Stone's 500 Greatest Albums of All Time
 NME's The 500 Greatest Albums of All Time